Andrew Karney, FIET, CEng, FRSA (born 24 May 1942) is a British electrical engineer, businessman and company director. He is also an accredited European Engineer.

Career
Karney studied engineering at Trinity College, Cambridge. He started his career working as a teacher for the United Nations Relief and Works Agency (UNRWA) in Lebanon and Gaza in 1964 and 1965, when it was occupied by Egypt. He was honoured by the United Nations Secretary-General, U Thant in 1969.

Karney worked as a development engineer at Standard Telephones and Cables on a small team headed by British engineer Tommy Flowers, who designed Colossus, the world's first programmable electronic computer, used to break German wartime codes, particularly the Lorenz cipher. He played an important role in the development of the world's first fully electronic digital telephone exchange, which was developed as an Anglo French collaboration, based in Paris, which was installed in Moorgate in the City of London in 1967. He also worked as a senior scientist at the central research laboratories of the UK General Electric Company on the development codecs for high speed (140 Mbit/s) digital transmission systems which were used to test the capabilities of helix wave guides (and later of optical fibres), digital radio receivers for GCHQ and electronic telephone exchanges. During this time he filed a number of international patents which were used by developers of the first digital telephone switching equipment in the UK, the US, Canada, France, Sweden and Japan.

In 1973, he joined Logica, an international systems company and was a senior member of team of engineers from Supreme Headquarters Allied Powers Europe, SHAPE Technical Center in the Hague, military personnel from NATO countries and industry defining the communications and IT requirements for the underground Static War HQ to be built near Mons in Belgium. He was project director of the European project based in Paris to bring the Internet to Europe from 1975 to 1976. INRIA in France, Euratom in Italy, the National Physical Laboratory (United Kingdom), ETH Zurich (Eidgenössische Technische Hochschule Zürich) and the Organisation Européenne pour la Recherche Nucléaire, commonly known as CERN, actively participated in the project and it was there that the World Wide Web was conceived by Tim Berners-Lee in 1989. In 1984, Karney became a main board director responsible for the telecommunications, electronics, space, government and media sectors as well as operations in Italy and Asia, which included he development of the trading system for the new unified Hong Kong Stock Exchange. During that time he was responsible for the development of the Customer Service System for British Telecommunications (BT/CSS), the £1bn total implementation, represented largest computer project undertaken in Europe and the largest integrated database in the world  and the development of early Text Messaging (SMS) for mobile phones.

In 1984, together with others, he founded Cable London plc – one of the first cable TV operations in the UK, which subsequently became part of Telewest now part of Virgin Media. He was a member of the UK National Electronics Council, seeking to improve links between academia and industry from 1980 to 1990

On leaving Logica in 1994, Karney became a director of NASDAQ quoted Integrated Micro Products, later acquired by Sun Microsystems (now part of Oracle Corporation) and chairman of Language Line Ltd, a telephone interpreting and language resources company founded by Lord Michael Young (politician), who also conceived the Consumers' Association Which? in the UK and the Open University, the first of its kind in the world. In 1997, he became an independent director of the Guardian Media Group plc and Guardian News and Media, publishers of the Guardian and Observer newspapers, chairing the IT steering board - responsible for the development of all the news and commercial platforms for the newspapers and websites. He was a director of Baronsmead Second Venture Trust from 2001–2016, a venture capital company, investing in a number of high technology and business services companies. In 2005 he was appointed chairman of the trustees of the international NGO, Integrity Action (formerly Tiri), which seeks practical solutions to making integrity work in governments, civil society and business. From 2009 to 2018, he was a trustee of Medical Aid for Palestinians which works for the health and dignity of Palestinians living under occupation and as refugees. He then became a trustee of the Welfare Association (UK) works to support some of the most marginalised Palestinian families and communities in the West Bank and the Gaza Strip and in the refugee camps in Lebanon. From January 2020, he was a director of Helix Technologies, a specialist developer of compact, high-performance, dielectric-loaded ceramic antennas for demanding telecommunications and navigation applications until the completion of a significant Venture Capital funding round in November 2021. 

He is a chartered engineer, fellow of the Institution of Engineering and Technology, a Freeman of the City of London, a fellow of the Royal Society for the encouragement of Arts, Manufactures & Commerce. He is a member of Chatham House (The Royal Institute of International Affairs), The Council for Arab-British Understanding and an expert on contemporary Middle Eastern affairs, particularly Palestine and Syria.

Personal life
Karney is one of six children. His father was Gilbert Henry Peter Karney, vicar of Embleton, Northumberland, his grandfather was Bishop Arthur Karney, the first bishop of Johannesburg. His mother was Celia Karney (née Richardson), granddaughter of John Wigham Richardson, a Quaker Victorian shipbuilder and founder of Swan Hunter and Wigham Richardson shipbuilders on Tyneside, who built the RMS Mauretania (1906). Karney was married to the former prima ballerina Beryl Goldwyn and they had one son Peter Karney born in 1972.

References

External links
Andrew Karney

English businesspeople
English electrical engineers
People from Northumberland
Living people
People educated at Rugby School
Alumni of Trinity College, Cambridge
Fellows of the Institution of Engineering and Technology
1942 births
Chatham House people